Sir John Richard Walter Reginald Carew Pole, 13th Baronet, OBE, DL (born 2 December 1938) is the present holder of the Pole baronetcy, granted to his ancestor by King Charles I in 1628. He lives at Antony House in Cornwall. He succeeded his father, Sir John Gawen Carew Pole, 12th Baronet, in 1993.

Public service
Sir Richard is a Deputy Lieutenant for the county of Cornwall, an Officer of the Order of the British Empire, a Trustee of the Tate Gallery, the Pilgrim Trust, and the Eden Project, a Governor of Gresham's School, Holt, and President of the Cornwall Gardens Trust.

He was High Sheriff of Cornwall for 1978 and is a past Prime Warden of the Worshipful Company of Fishmongers and a past president of the Royal Horticultural Society, from which he received the Victoria Medal of Honour in 2007.

His wife, Mary Dawnay (Lady Carew Pole), is a Lady-in-Waiting to Anne, Princess Royal and past President of the Royal Cornwall Show.

References

External links

 
  Sir Richard Carew Pole at the Royal Horticultural Society
 Antony House at the National Trust

1938 births
Living people
People from Antony, Cornwall
People educated at Eton College
Baronets in the Baronetage of England
Officers of the Order of the British Empire
Deputy Lieutenants of Cornwall
Victoria Medal of Honour recipients
High Sheriffs of Cornwall